James William Elliott (1833–1915), usually cited as J. W. Elliott, was an English collector of nursery rhymes. Together with George Dalziel and Edward Dalziel who did the engraving he published Mother Goose's Nursery Rhymes and Nursery Songs Set to Music in the 1870s.

He is cited as the author of the hymn tune "Church Triumphant" which is used to sing "I know that my Redeemer lives."

References

External links
 
 

1833 births
1915 deaths
English song collectors
English literary historians
Historians of English literature
English male non-fiction writers